"Parallax" is the third episode of the science fiction television series Star Trek: Voyager. The episode was directed by Kim Friedman and broadcast on January 23, 1995. The story was written by Jim Trombetta with the teleplay by Brannon Braga.

The starship Voyager detects a distress call and stops to investigate.

Casting 
In this episode, actor Josh Clark guest stars as Starfleet Lt. Joseph Carey, and Martha Hackett as a Maquis, Seska. Martha Hackett had previously guest starred on Star Trek: Deep Space Nine, in "The Search".

Writing 
This episode's teleplay was written by Brannon Braga from a story by Jim Trombetta. Brannon Braga was one of the major writers for Star Trek in the late 1990s and early 2000s. Another input to the writing was the Star Trek science advisor Andre Bormanis. One of the inspirations for this story, was the idea of submarine trapped under ice, which then must get to the surface. One idea for being trapped was something like black hole or collapsed star, but because that did not work well from a real science perspective, Bormanis invented the idea of a "Class 4 Singularity" for the episode.

Plot
As Voyager starts its way back home from the Delta Quadrant, tensions between the Starfleet and the Maquis crewmembers begin to rise, and some brief hostilities are incurred. However, both Captain Kathryn Janeway and her first officer, Chakotay, originally the captain of the Maquis crew, agree they need to integrate the two crews as one to fill vacancies left by the disastrous events to date. Of note, Chakotay recommends B'Elanna Torres, one of the more outspoken Maquis and a former Starfleet cadet, to be Chief of Engineering, a move that Janeway is hesitant about, considering that Torres recently broke another engineer's nose in a fight.

As the ship passes near a quantum singularity, the Voyager crew detect a ship stuck in the singularity's event horizon. Receiving no contact with the ship, they attempt to move in closer to engage the ship via tractor beams, but the result damages more of Voyager's systems. Janeway orders the crew to take Voyager to a nearby planet to seek help for the trapped ship. However, after some time has passed, the crew finds themselves back at the singularity, and quickly realize the ship they are seeing is themselves from before. The ship has become trapped in the singularity, and it is impacting several of the ship's systems.

Eventually, they discover a point in space where Voyager crossed into the singularity, but it has since shrunk, too small for Voyager to exit through. Janeway takes Torres, who has knowledge of singularities, on a shuttle to the opening, using the shuttle's shields to expand the opening large enough for Voyager to pass through. However, the result damages their communications systems; on returning to Voyager they find two versions of the ship, both appearing real to their sensors. Though they have a heated argument about which ship is the correct Voyager, Janeway makes the ultimate decision, and correctly picks the right vessel. Voyager leaves the singularity safely and begins to effect repairs. Janeway follows through on Chakotay's advice and promotes Torres to Chief Engineer.

Reception 
"Parallax" was evaluated by USA Today as an interesting episode of the franchise and this series, noting the acting performance by Kate Mulgrew as Captain Janeway.

This episode explored the idea of temporal reflections. This concept was acknowledged by the 2016 Star Trek novella, Department of Temporal Investigations: Time Lock.

In 2019, Higgy Pop identified this episode as one of the time travel stories of the Star Trek franchise. They observe that this episode reveals the tensions between the Maquis and Federation crew-members as they struggle to make contact with another spaceship apparently caught in a temporal anomaly with the USS Voyager.

In 2020, Tor.com rated this episode 6/10.

References

External links

 

Doux Review – Star Trek Voyager: Parallax

Star Trek: Voyager (season 1) episodes
1995 American television episodes
Television episodes written by Brannon Braga